Maluym may refer to:

Malum Atoll, Nuguria
Malum in se, Latin phrase used to refer to conduct assessed as sinful or inherently wrong by nature, independent of regulations governing the conduct
Malum perforans, long-lasting, usually painless ulcer that penetrates deep into or through the skin, usually on the sole of the foot
Malum prohibitum, Latin phrase used in law to refer to conduct that constitutes an unlawful act only by virtue of statute
Shah Malum, 14th-century Sufi Muslim figure in the Sylhet region

See also
Maloum, a 1999 album by Nawal Al Zoghbi